The Alfa Romeo Issima is a concept design car by the Swiss engineering company Sbarro.

Its name derives from the Italian suffix "-issima" ("very very" for feminine names), used on adjectives.

Technical specifications

Engine: 12 cylinders (two V6 twin in line) Alfa Romeo, 4 valves per cylinder
configuration: front longitudinal
displacement: 5918 cc (2 x 2959 cc)
power: 
chassis: Dual Frame
transmission: rear wheel drive
gearbox: manual
wheels: front : 8,5 x 19 " / rear : 11 x 19 "
tracks front/rear : 1,70 / 1,80 m

References 

Issima